The Asbest constituency (No. 172) is a Russian legislative constituency in Sverdlovsk Oblast. Until 2007 Artyomovsky constituency covered most of eastern Sverdlovsk Oblast. However, after 2015 redistricting the constituency was significantly altered with most of former Artyomovsky constituency placed into new Asbest constituency, which now stretches from central Yekaterinburg eastwards to the border with Tyumen Oblast.

Members elected

Election results

1993

|-
! colspan=2 style="background-color:#E9E9E9;text-align:left;vertical-align:top;" |Candidate
! style="background-color:#E9E9E9;text-align:left;vertical-align:top;" |Party
! style="background-color:#E9E9E9;text-align:right;" |Votes
! style="background-color:#E9E9E9;text-align:right;" |%
|-
|style="background-color:"|
|align=left|Tamara Tokareva
|align=left|Agrarian Party
|
|29.81%
|-
|style="background-color:#DBB726"|
|align=left|Igor Prudnikov
|align=left|Democratic Party
| -
|19.30%
|-
| colspan="5" style="background-color:#E9E9E9;"|
|- style="font-weight:bold"
| colspan="3" style="text-align:left;" | Total
| 
| 100%
|-
| colspan="5" style="background-color:#E9E9E9;"|
|- style="font-weight:bold"
| colspan="4" |Source:
|
|}

1995

|-
! colspan=2 style="background-color:#E9E9E9;text-align:left;vertical-align:top;" |Candidate
! style="background-color:#E9E9E9;text-align:left;vertical-align:top;" |Party
! style="background-color:#E9E9E9;text-align:right;" |Votes
! style="background-color:#E9E9E9;text-align:right;" |%
|-
|style="background-color:"|
|align=left|Svetlana Gvozdeva
|align=left|Yabloko
|
|17.14%
|-
|style="background-color:"|
|align=left|Tamara Tokareva (incumbent)
|align=left|Agrarian Party
|
|11.94%
|-
|style="background-color:#1C1A0D"|
|align=left|Vladimir Raldugin
|align=left|Forward, Russia!
|
|11.13%
|-
|style="background-color:"|
|align=left|Valery Novoselov
|align=left|Communist Party
|
|9.99%
|-
|style="background-color:#D50000"|
|align=left|Vladimir Alekseyev
|align=left|Communists and Working Russia - for the Soviet Union
|
|8.95%
|-
|style="background-color:"|
|align=left|Yury Alekseyev
|align=left|Independent
|
|8.21%
|-
|style="background-color:"|
|align=left|Igor Oks
|align=left|Independent
|
|7.47%
|-
|style="background-color:"|
|align=left|Gennady Mityayev
|align=left|Liberal Democratic Party
|
|6.44%
|-
|style="background-color:#019CDC"|
|align=left|Dmitry Dontsov
|align=left|Party of Russian Unity and Accord
|
|3.93%
|-
|style="background-color:"|
|align=left|Sergey Feopentov
|align=left|Independent
|
|2.91%
|-
|style="background-color:"|
|align=left|Valery Romanov
|align=left|Independent
|
|1.23%
|-
|style="background-color:#000000"|
|colspan=2 |against all
|
|8.93%
|-
| colspan="5" style="background-color:#E9E9E9;"|
|- style="font-weight:bold"
| colspan="3" style="text-align:left;" | Total
| 
| 100%
|-
| colspan="5" style="background-color:#E9E9E9;"|
|- style="font-weight:bold"
| colspan="4" |Source:
|
|}

1999

|-
! colspan=2 style="background-color:#E9E9E9;text-align:left;vertical-align:top;" |Candidate
! style="background-color:#E9E9E9;text-align:left;vertical-align:top;" |Party
! style="background-color:#E9E9E9;text-align:right;" |Votes
! style="background-color:#E9E9E9;text-align:right;" |%
|-
|style="background-color:"|
|align=left|Svetlana Gvozdeva (incumbent)
|align=left|Unity
|
|22.13%
|-
|style="background-color:#020266"|
|align=left|Dmitry Golovanov
|align=left|Russian Socialist Party
|
|19.46%
|-
|style="background-color:#3B9EDF"|
|align=left|Tatyana Merzlyakova
|align=left|Fatherland – All Russia
|
|11.91%
|-
|style="background-color:"|
|align=left|Valery Novoselov
|align=left|Communist Party
|
|10.14%
|-
|style="background-color:"|
|align=left|Aleksandr Kosintsev
|align=left|Yabloko
|
|10.07%
|-
|style="background-color:"|
|align=left|Vladimir Skubak
|align=left|Independent
|
|5.32%
|-
|style="background-color:#C21022"|
|align=left|Nikolay Klimenko
|align=left|Party of Pensioners
|
|3.74%
|-
|style="background-color:"|
|align=left|Aleksandr Mironov
|align=left|Independent
|
|1.77%
|-
|style="background-color:"|
|align=left|Vyacheslav Pelevin
|align=left|Independent
|
|1.29%
|-
|style="background-color:"|
|align=left|Igor Konakov
|align=left|Independent
|
|1.05%
|-
|style="background-color:"|
|align=left|Dmitry Pitersky
|align=left|Independent
|
|0.58%
|-
|style="background-color:#084284"|
|align=left|Aleksandr Trifonov
|align=left|Spiritual Heritage
|
|0.52%
|-
|style="background-color:"|
|align=left|Pyotr Kikilyk
|align=left|Independent
|
|0.39%
|-
|style="background-color:#000000"|
|colspan=2 |against all
|
|9.23%
|-
| colspan="5" style="background-color:#E9E9E9;"|
|- style="font-weight:bold"
| colspan="3" style="text-align:left;" | Total
| 
| 100%
|-
| colspan="5" style="background-color:#E9E9E9;"|
|- style="font-weight:bold"
| colspan="4" |Source:
|
|}

2003

|-
! colspan=2 style="background-color:#E9E9E9;text-align:left;vertical-align:top;" |Candidate
! style="background-color:#E9E9E9;text-align:left;vertical-align:top;" |Party
! style="background-color:#E9E9E9;text-align:right;" |Votes
! style="background-color:#E9E9E9;text-align:right;" |%
|-
|style="background-color:"|
|align=left|Igor Barinov
|align=left|United Russia
|
|36.16%
|-
|style="background-color:#00A1FF"|
|align=left|Aleksandr Burkov
|align=left|Party of Russia's Rebirth-Russian Party of Life
|
|19.03%
|-
|style="background-color:"|
|align=left|Yury Kuznetsov
|align=left|Yabloko
|
|17.98%
|-
|style="background-color:"|
|align=left|Vladimir Kadochnikov
|align=left|Communist Party
|
|9.40%
|-
|style="background-color:"|
|align=left|Tamara Rusakova
|align=left|Liberal Democratic Party
|
|2.94%
|-
|style="background-color:"|
|align=left|Fyodor Sobolev
|align=left|Independent
|
|1.74%
|-
|style="background-color:#C21022"|
|align=left|Aleksandr Ilmanov
|align=left|Russian Pensioners' Party-Party of Social Justice
|
|1.66%
|-
|style="background-color:"|
|align=left|Vladimir Drobov
|align=left|Agrarian Party
|
|1.54%
|-
|style="background-color:"|
|align=left|Aleksandr Kamyanchuk
|align=left|Independent
|
|1.12%
|-
|style="background-color:#14589F"|
|align=left|Vladimir Gerasimenko
|align=left|Development of Enterprise
|
|0.38%
|-
|style="background-color:#000000"|
|colspan=2 |against all
|
|6.44%
|-
| colspan="5" style="background-color:#E9E9E9;"|
|- style="font-weight:bold"
| colspan="3" style="text-align:left;" | Total
| 
| 100%
|-
| colspan="5" style="background-color:#E9E9E9;"|
|- style="font-weight:bold"
| colspan="4" |Source:
|
|}

2016

|-
! colspan=2 style="background-color:#E9E9E9;text-align:left;vertical-align:top;" |Candidate
! style="background-color:#E9E9E9;text-align:leftt;vertical-align:top;" |Party
! style="background-color:#E9E9E9;text-align:right;" |Votes
! style="background-color:#E9E9E9;text-align:right;" |%
|-
| style="background-color: " |
|align=left|Maksim Ivanov
|align=left|United Russia
|
|37.70%
|-
|style="background-color:"|
|align=left|Igor Toroshchin
|align=left|Liberal Democratic Party
|
|16.98%
|-
| style="background-color: " |
|align=left|Vladimir Filippov
|align=left|A Just Russia
|
|15.61%
|-
|style="background-color: " |
|align=left|Denis Belov
|align=left|Communists of Russia
|
|7.39%
|-
|style="background-color:"|
|align=left|Dmitry Cheremisin
|align=left|Rodina
|
|3.62%
|-
|style="background-color:"|
|align=left|Sergey Babkin
|align=left|Party of Growth
|
|3.55%
|-
|style="background-color: " |
|align=left|Sergey Tyurikov
|align=left|Yabloko
|
|3.46%
|-
|style="background-color: " |
|align=left|Mikhail Tuponogov
|align=left|The Greens
|
|1.71%
|-
|style="background-color:"|
|align=left|Yevgeny Martyshko
|align=left|Patriots of Russia
|
|1.67%
|-
| colspan="5" style="background-color:#E9E9E9;"|
|- style="font-weight:bold"
| colspan="3" style="text-align:left;" | Total
| 
| 100%
|-
| colspan="5" style="background-color:#E9E9E9;"|
|- style="font-weight:bold"
| colspan="4" |Source:
|
|}

2021

|-
! colspan=2 style="background-color:#E9E9E9;text-align:left;vertical-align:top;" |Candidate
! style="background-color:#E9E9E9;text-align:left;vertical-align:top;" |Party
! style="background-color:#E9E9E9;text-align:right;" |Votes
! style="background-color:#E9E9E9;text-align:right;" |%
|-
| style="background-color: " |
|align=left|Maksim Ivanov (incumbent)
|align=left|United Russia
|
|38.67%
|-
|style="background-color:"|
|align=left|Natalya Krylova
|align=left|Communist Party
|
|25.90%
|-
|style="background-color:"|
|align=left|Igor Toroshchin
|align=left|Liberal Democratic Party
|
|10.83%
|-
|style="background-color:"|
|align=left|Roman Isayev
|align=left|New People
|
|9.51%
|-
|style="background-color: " |
|align=left|Gennady Sevastyanov
|align=left|Yabloko
|
|4.66%
|-
|style="background-color:"|
|align=left|Maria Prokasheva
|align=left|Rodina
|
|2.67%
|-
| colspan="5" style="background-color:#E9E9E9;"|
|- style="font-weight:bold"
| colspan="3" style="text-align:left;" | Total
| 
| 100%
|-
| colspan="5" style="background-color:#E9E9E9;"|
|- style="font-weight:bold"
| colspan="4" |Source:
|
|}

Notes

References

Russian legislative constituencies
Politics of Sverdlovsk Oblast